Vertigo alpestris is a species of minute, air-breathing land snail, terrestrial pulmonate gastropod molluscs or micromollusks in the family Vertiginidae, the whorl snails. 

Subspecies
 † Vertigo alpestris tobieni Schlickum & Strauch, 1979 
 Vertigo alpestris uturyotoensis Kuroda & Hukuda, 1944

Shell description 

The shell is subcylindrical, thin and semitransparent,  closely and rather strongly striate in the line of growth. Its color is very glossy, a pale yellowish-horn-color. The periphery is rounded: epidermis thin. The shell has 4½ convex whorls, but slightly compressed. The spire is short, abrupt and bluntly pointed. The suture is excessively deep.

The shell aperture is semioval and subangular, owing to the outward compression of the periphery. The aperture has 4 teeth: one sharp and 
prominent tooth on the middle of the pillar [parietal wall], one strong and also prominent and thick tooth on the pillar lip, and two lamellae or plate-like teeth which are placed at some little distance within the outer lip, but not on any rib or callous fold as in Vertigo pygmaea. The labial teeth are visible on the outside, owing to the thinness and transparency of the shell. The outer lip is rather thick and very slightly reflected, not strengthened by any rib either outside or inside. The outer edge is abruptly reflected. The inner lip is somewhat thickened in adult specimen. The umbilicus is small and narrow, but rather deep.

The width of the adult shell is 0.9-1.1 mm, the height is 1.6-2.15 mm.

Distribution 
This species occurs in countries and islands including:
 Bulgaria
 Czech Republic
 Poland
 Slovakia
 Ukraine
 Great Britain
 Hungary

References
This article incorporates public domain text from the reference

 Bank, R. A.; Neubert, E. (2017). Checklist of the land and freshwater Gastropoda of Europe. Last update: July 16th, 2017
 Sysoev, A. V. & Schileyko, A. A. (2009). Land snails and slugs of Russia and adjacent countries. Sofia/Moskva (Pensoft). 312 pp., 142 plates.

External links
 Distribution of Vertigo alpestris at European Environment Agency webpage
 Alder, J. (1838). Supplement to a catalogue of the land and fresh-water Testaceous Mollusca, found in the vicinity of Newcastle. Transactions of the Natural History Society of Northumberland, Durham and Newcastle upon Tyne. 2:337-342.
 Pfeiffer, L. (1847). Diagnosen neuer Landschnecken. Zeitschrift für Malakozoologie. Cassel (Theodor Fischer). 4 (10): 145-151
 Gredler, V. M. (1856). Tirols Land- und Süßwasser-Conchylien I. Die Landconchylien. Verhandlungen der Kaiserlich-königlichen Zoologisch-botanischen Gesellschaft in Wien. 6: 25–162. Wien

alpestris
Gastropods described in 1838